The 2001 Asian Junior Badminton Championships were held in Taipei Gymnasium, Taipei, Taiwan from 8–14 July. South Korea won four titles in the individuals event in the girs' singles, boys' doubles, girls' doubles and mixed doubles event, and the boys' singles title won by the Indonesian player. Malaysia and South Korea clinched the boys' and girls' team event respectively.

Medalists

Finals

Medal table

See also
 List of sporting events in Taiwan

References

External links 
 Results at www.badminton.or.jp

Badminton Asia Junior Championships
Asian Junior Badminton Championships
Asian Junior Badminton Championships
International sports competitions hosted by Taiwan
2001 in youth sport